Elaine Castillo (born 1984) is an American writer. She was born and raised in the San Francisco Bay Area and attended University of California, Berkeley. In 2009, Castillo moved to London and later received a MA in Creative & Life Writing from Goldsmiths, University of London. She was a three-time recipient of the Roselyn Schneider Eisner Prize for prose while at UC Berkeley, and she has also been nominated for the Pat Kavanagh Award, a Pushcart Prize, and a Gatewood Prize.

Her first novel, America Is Not the Heart was published in 2018 and received widespread acclaim. Ligaya Mishan, writing for the New York Times Book Review, describes it as "hungrily ambitious in sweep and documentary in detail, and reads like a seismograph of the aftershocks from trading one life for another". Maris Kreizman, wrote in Vulture that "the writing in America Is Not the Heart is tremendous, the descriptions evocative, and the characters will stay with you". Parts of the book take place in Milpitas, California, where Castillo grew up. The title of the novel is a reference to Carlos Bulosan's novel America Is in the Heart. Castillo is openly bisexual  and has said it was important for her to write about bisexual women in her novel because of how rarely they are depicted. She is also of Filipino descent.

Works 
 America Is Not the Heart. Viking, 2018. Novel. 
 How to Read Now: Essays. 2022.

References 

Living people
American women novelists
University of California, Berkeley alumni
21st-century American novelists
American writers of Filipino descent
American novelists of Asian descent
21st-century American women writers
Bisexual women
American LGBT novelists
1984 births
American expatriates in the United Kingdom
American bisexual writers